The Balkan fritillary (Boloria graeca), is a butterfly in the family Nymphalidae.

It is found in the Alps and the Balkans. The larva feeds on Viola species.

The orange upperside has a brown basal suffusion adorned with various marks of brown color, submarginal round spots and lines forming festoons. The hindwing forms an angle at its anterior edge. The underside of the forewings is identical, that of the hindwings presents silver designs, a line of small circles and greenish marbling in the female

External links
 
 Leps It
 Butterflies of Bulgaria

Boloria
Butterflies described in 1870
Butterflies of Europe
Taxa named by Otto Staudinger